Shawnee Peak, elevation , is a summit in the Kenosha Mountains of central Colorado. The peak is in the Lost Creek Wilderness of Pike National Forest west of Bailey.

See also

List of Colorado mountain ranges
List of Colorado mountain summits
List of Colorado fourteeners
List of Colorado 4000 meter prominent summits
List of the most prominent summits of Colorado
List of Colorado county high points

References

External links

Shawnee Peak on Mountainzone.com

Mountains of Park County, Colorado
Mountains of Colorado
North American 3000 m summits